Notimex is the  official Mexican news agency, created on August 20, 1968 to handle coverage of the 1968 Summer Olympics. Notimex is headquartered in Mexico City and has five hundred and sixty-eight regional coordinating offices throughout Mexico. Its staff consists of over 30000 writers, editors, photographers, reporters, and correspondents.

It was originally called Agencia Mexicana de Noticias Notimex. Its goals, according to law, were contributing to the realization of the people's right to information through the provision of professional news services, to Mexican state and any other person, entity or public body or private, domestic or foreign, with genuine editorial independence (Article 1). Notimex's slogan is "News Agency of the Mexican State".

In June 2006, following reform of its charter, its official name became Agencia de Noticias del Estado Mexicano. The principal reform was independence from the Secretary of the Interior and administration by a governing board composed of representatives of the state.

The agency has been on strike since February 21, 2020, and halted its news operations in June of the same year.

Organization of Notimex 
The administration agencies are:

 Governing Board. Composed of one representative from each of the following agencies: Secretariat of Public Education, Secretariat of the Interior, Secretariat of Finance and Public Credit, Secretariat of Foreign Affairs, Federal Electoral Institute and unionized workers from Notimex and two representatives of the Editorial Advisory Board;
 The Director-General, who is appointed by the President of Mexico.
 On July 30, 2007, Sergio Uzeta Murcio was approved unanimously by the Committee in charge of the Senate, as Director General of the new Notimex.
On March 21, 2019, Sanjuana Martínez was designated as Director General, the first woman to occupy that position.

References

External links 
  

News agencies based in Mexico
Mass media in Mexico City
Mass media companies established in 1968
Mexican companies established in 1968